The Comédiens routiers was a group of amateur actors. In 1929, they were founded within the Scouts de France by Léon Chancerel.

In Belgium, Maurice Huisman and his brother  also created a troupe of Comédiens routiers in 1935.

References

Bibliography

External links 
 Comédiens routiers
 Comédiens routiers (search for Comédiens routiers)

Theatre in Belgium
Theatre in France